Beverly Center is a shopping mall in Los Angeles, California, United States. It is an eight-story structure located at the edge of Beverly Hills and West Hollywood, between La Cienega and San Vicente boulevards. Anchor tenants include Bloomingdale's and Macy's, and a Macy's men's store. The mall's dramatic six-story series of escalators offer visitors views of the Hollywood Hills, Downtown Los Angeles, and Los Angeles Westside.

Retail tenants
The mall contains a number of retailers, including (as of 2017): Banana Republic, Victoria's Secret, Forever 21, Dolce & Gabbana, Louis Vuitton, Diesel, Uniqlo, Gucci, Prada, Ferrari Store, Burberry, Fendi, Jimmy Choo, Montblanc, Tumi, and Hugo Boss.

History

The Beverly Center was originally opened in 1982 by developers A. Alfred Taubman, Sheldon Gordon, and E. Phillip Lyon. (The site's former occupant was a small amusement park known as "Beverly Park", featuring a Ferris wheel, merry-go-round, and mini roller-coaster, and a pony ride called "Ponyland". The northeast corner of the mall, at the intersection of Beverly and La Cienega Boulevards, is the geographic center of the city's studio zone.

The mall's unusual shape and lack of street frontage along San Vicente Boulevard are the result of both its position at the intersection of a number of angled streets and its location above the Salt Lake Oil Field.  the western portion of the mall property contained a cluster of oil wells in an active drilling enclosure operated by Freeport-McMoRan (formally Plains Exploration & Production.

The mall opening featured the debut on July 16, 1982, of a multiplex movie theater containing 14 screens, then the largest number of movie screens in any US multiplex shopping mall. Even though the movie theater was located in Los Angeles, the opening was newsworthy enough to warrant a full article in The New York Times. In the late 1980s, three smaller screens were removed on the main floor, so two larger auditoriums could be built on the roof. The theater portion of the mall was closed altogether on June 3, 2010.

The mall contained the USA's first Hard Rock Cafe, the third installment of the restaurant chain, following those in London and Toronto. This location closed in 2007. The Beverly Center was originally anchored by Bullock's and The Broadway department stores, and in 1993 Bullock's opened a separate Bullock's Men's store, before both stores were renamed Macy's in 1996. The Broadway closed its location in 1996 when it was absorbed into Macy's and its former store was reopened as a Bloomingdale's in 1997. Bed Bath & Beyond formerly operated a store at the Beverly Center until it closed in 2016.

In 2004, Taubman Centers, the public Real Estate Investment Trust and successor to A. Alfred Taubman's shopping center interests, purchased its partners minority investments stake in the property.

The Beverly Center underwent a renovation from 2006 to 2008 that had stores complaining about a decline of foot traffic. These renovations included reconstructing the escalators visible from the outside. Still, the retailer Calvin Klein opened a new store in the mall in early 2008.

A food court formerly operated at the mall until 2014, when it was closed. Uniqlo opened one of its first Southern California locations in the space.

The Beverly Center had many dining options, but most of the restaurants that occupied the street level have closed. Grand Lux Cafe closed its only California restaurant in 2013. Later in 2015, The Capital Grille, which opened in the former Hard Rock Cafe space in 2012, closed. In January 2016, P.F. Chang's shuttered its restaurant at the mall. Later that year, California Pizza Kitchen closed and Chipotle moved to a new pad at the corner of Beverly Boulevard and Croft Avenue. As part of renovations starting in 2016, the mall aims to bring restaurants back to the empty spaces on the street level.

Starting in March 2016, the Center underwent a major renovation that aimed to add a food hall and several new street-level restaurants and a skylight. Renovation costs were given as US$500 million. The new Center will also have a perforated steel facade on the outside of the building and an upgraded parking structure which will include technology to help drivers remember where they've parked.

On September 28, 2019, French luxury brand Kenzo opened on the 7th floor of the Beverly Center.

On October 1, 2019, it was announced that Forever 21 would be closing as part of a plan to close 178 stores nationwide. But as of July 2020, the store is still open.

As many businesses were required to close during the COVID-19 pandemic, the landlord said tenants still needed to pay rent because of its own obligations to lenders and service providers.

In popular culture
A chapter in the 1985 Bret Easton Ellis novel Less than Zero is set in The Beverly Center.
The Beverly Center was the setting of the 1991 film Scenes from a Mall starring Bette Midler and Woody Allen. The movie's interior mall scenes were filmed between the Beverly Center and Stamford Town Center in Connecticut, another Taubman mall.
The Beverly Center played a part of the plot near the end of the 1997 disaster thriller Volcano starring Tommy Lee Jones and Anne Heche. A triage and childcare center for neighboring Cedars-Sinai Medical Center was set up in the mall's Hard Rock Cafe. This was evacuated when a geyser of lava erupted out of San Vicente Boulevard, threatening the structure and its occupants.
 The Beverly Center was shown briefly in the 1997 film Selena, where Selena (played by then up-and-coming actress Jennifer Lopez) and her friend went shopping at an upscale store in the mall before Selena attended the Grammy Awards. 
 On May 18, 2009, rap artist Dolla was fatally shot at the Beverly Center.
 In the film Eraserhead, industrial wasteland scenes were shot at the present location of the Beverly Center. Prior to its current state of development, the site was an oil field.
 On the 2013 SNL sketch "Waking Up With Kimye", Lady Gaga plays an Apple Store employee at the mall who works at the Genius Bar.
 The Beverly Center (named as Beverly Hills Mall) was the setting in the animated series Totally Spies!, is shown from the first three seasons until was destroyed in the episode "Head Shrinker Much?" and was replaced by The Groove in the fourth season.
Appears in the video game Grand Theft Auto V as "Rockford Plaza"

See also

Zev Yaroslavsky, Los Angeles City Council member (1974–94) who voted in favor of building the Beverly Center
 Studio zone—The Beverly Center is located at the intersection that marks the center of this zone, considered "local" by Los Angeles–area entertainment industry labor unions.
 Yardbird Southern Table & Bar, located inside the Beverly Center
List of largest shopping malls in the United States

References

External links

fact sheet

Landmarks in Los Angeles
Shopping malls established in 1982
Taubman Centers
Shopping malls on the Westside, Los Angeles
West Hollywood, California
Massimiliano Fuksas buildings
Welton Becket buildings